Dear Mr. President is a protest song by hip-hop producer Fredwreck. The song is available free on the Internet. It is also available on Fredwrecks' Greatest Hits Episode 1 CD.

History 
The politically charged song is directed at George W. Bush.

It features Everlast, Mobb Deep, The Alchemist, Mack 10, WC, Evidence, Defari, KRS-One, and B-Real.

Financial and time constraints meant that this song had to be recorded in parts. Mobb Deep's vocals were recorded using a laptop in a hotel room.

References 

2004 singles
Anti-war songs
Protest songs
Songs about George W. Bush
2004 songs